Melinda is a genus of flies in the family Calliphoridae. In general little is known of their biology. A few
species have been reared from snails. One – Melinda gentilis – is parasitic in the snails Helicella virgata and Goniodiseus rotundata and Melinda itoi is a parasite of the snail Acusta despecta sieboldiana.

Distribution
Most species are Oriental and Australian, but are found throughout the Old World tropical regions, and some parts the Palaearctic Region such as North Africa, Europe, China and Japan. In the Australian region, it is found in Fiji and the Samoan Islands.

Species
Melinda abdominalis (Malloch, 1931)
Melinda auriceps (Malloch, 1931)
Melinda bisetosa (Bezzi, 1927)
Melinda crinitarsis (Villeneuve, 1927)
Melinda dubia (Malloch, 1931)
Melinda elegans Kurahashi, 1970
Melinda flavibasis (Malloch, 1931)
Melinda gentilis Robineau-Desvoidy, 1830 (= cognata Meigen, 1830)
Melinda io Kurahashi, 1965
Melinda maai Kurahashi, 1970
Melinda malaisei Kurahashi, 1970
Melinda nigricans (Villeneuve, 1927)
Melinda nuortevae Kurahashi, 1970
Melinda ponti Kurahashi, 1970
Melinda pusilla (Villeneuve, 1927)
Melinda scutellata (Sen.-White, 1923)
Melinda vanemdeni Kurahashi, 1970
Melinda viridicyanea (Robineau-Desvoidy, 1830)
Melinda xiphophora (Bezzi, 1927)

References

Calliphoridae
Taxa named by Jean-Baptiste Robineau-Desvoidy
Oestroidea genera